Alraune is a fictional female character in a novel of the same name by German writer Hanns Heinz Ewers.

Alraune may also refer to:

Films
Alraune (1918 film), a Hungarian adaptation of the novel co-directed by Michael Curtiz
Alraune (1928 film), a German adaptation of the novel starring Brigitte Helm
Alraune (1930 film), a German science fiction horror film
Alraune (1952 film), a West German production

Other 
Alraune, the German term for a Mandrake root
Alraune, an alternate German name for the mythical Kobold
Alraune, the 1996 debut album of Thrones